Raquel Kops-Jones and Abigail Spears were the defending champions, but lost in the semifinals to Samantha Stosur and Zhang Shuai.
Kristina Mladenovic and Flavia Pennetta won the title, defeating Samantha Stosur and Zhang Shuai in the final, 6-4, 6-3.

Seeds

Draw

Draw

References
 Main Draw

HP Open - Doubles
2013 HP Open